Eugène Legrand (born 11 June 1934) is a French boxer. He competed in the men's light middleweight event at the 1956 Summer Olympics.

References

1934 births
Living people
French male boxers
Olympic boxers of France
Boxers at the 1956 Summer Olympics
Place of birth missing (living people)
Light-middleweight boxers